The Big Bad Wolf is an animated short released on April 13, 1934, by United Artists, produced by Walt Disney and directed by Burt Gillett as part of the Silly Symphony series. Acting partly as a sequel to the wildly successful adaptation of The Three Little Pigs of the previous year (maintaining the previous film's title characters as well as its villain), this film also acts as an adaptation of the fairy-tale Little Red Riding Hood, with the Big Bad Wolf from 1933's Three Little Pigs acting as the adversary to Little Red Riding Hood and her grandmother.

Plot
Ignoring the advice of Practical Pig, Little Red Riding Hood, escorted by Fiddler and Fifer, takes the short cut through the woods to Grandma's house. They end up encountering Goldilocks the Fairy Queen, who is soon revealed, thanks to a branch breaking, to be the Big Bad Wolf in disguise. Realizing they'd been tricked, Fiddler and Fifer run home, whilst Little Red Riding Hood escapes from the Wolf. The Big Bad Wolf, however, isn't giving up on getting dinner, and goes to Grandma's house, where he chases Grandma into the closet and gets in bed disguised as her. Little Red Riding Hood arrives and after the expected "what big eyes/nose/mouth you've got" spiel is terrified to see the Big Bad Wolf is posing as her grandmother. Fiddler and Fifer manage to get Practical Pig, who manages to beat the Wolf by putting popcorn seeds and hot coals down his pants. With the wolf defeated once again, Little Red Riding Hood and the pigs sing and play "Who's Afraid of the Big Bad Wolf".

Voice cast
Shirley Reed as Little Red Riding Hood
Pinto Colvig as Practical Pig
Billy Bletcher as Zeke Midas Wolf
Mary Moder as Fiddler Pig
Dorothy Compton as Fifer Pig

Reaction
Made as a somewhat reluctant response to the success of the earlier short, The Big Bad Wolf did not quite achieve the levels of popularity of Three Little Pigs (which was huge), though two more shorts predominantly featuring the Big Bad Wolf and the pigs came about (The Three Little Wolves and The Practical Pig), in addition to countless appearances in a variety of shorts, comic strips, war-time propaganda pieces and TV series.

Home media
The short was released on December 4, 2001, on Walt Disney Treasures: Silly Symphonies - The Historic Musical Animated Classics.

References

External links 
 

1934 films
1934 short films
1930s Disney animated short films
American sequel films
Silly Symphonies
1934 animated films
Films directed by Burt Gillett
Films produced by Walt Disney
Animated films about animals
Films based on Little Red Riding Hood
Films based on The Three Little Pigs
Films scored by Frank Churchill
1930s American films